is a town located in Hidaka District, Wakayama Prefecture, Japan. , the town had an estimated population of 7,970 in 3266 households and a population density of 170 persons per km².

Geography 
Hidaka is located on the coast  in central Wakayama Prefecture, facing the Kii Channel. The coastline is a ria coast and the climate is mild..

Neighboring municipalities
Wakayama Prefecture
Gobō
Hirogawa
Mihama
Hidakagawa
Yura

Climate
Hidaka has a Humid subtropical climate (Köppen Cfa) characterized by warm summers and cool winters with light to no snowfall.  The average annual temperature in Hidaka is 16.8 °C. The average annual rainfall is 1878 mm with September as the wettest month. The temperatures are highest on average in August, at around 26.7 °C, and lowest in January, at around 7.3 °C. The area is subject to typhoons in summer.

Demographics
Per Japanese census data, the population of Hidaka has remained fairly steady over the past century.

History
The area of the modern town of Hidaka was within ancient Kii Province. The villages of Shiga, Hizaki, Higashi-Uchihara and Nishi-Uchihara were established with the creation of the modern municipalities system on April 1, 1889. Higachi-Uchihara and Nishi-Uchihara merged on August 1, 1941 to form Uchihara Village. Uchihara merged with Shiga and Hizaki on October 1, 1954 to form the town of Hidaka.

Government
Hidaka has a mayor-council form of government with a directly elected mayor and a unicameral city council of 12 members. Hidaka collectively with the other municipalities of Hidaka District, contributes three members to the Wakayama Prefectural Assembly. In terms of national politics, the town is part of Wakayama 3rd district of the lower house of the Diet of Japan.

Economy
The economy of Hidaka is centered on commercial fishing and agriculture. The main crops are rice and vegetables in the flatlands and horticulture in the mountains. Plans by Kansai Electric to construct a nuclear power plant in Hidaka were cancelled due to vehement local opposition.

Education
Hidaka has three public elementary schools and one public middle schools operated by the town government. The town does not have a high school.

Transportation

Railway 
 JR West – Kisei Main Line

Highways

Local attractions
Shishigase Pass on the Kumano Kodo, National Historic Site and World Heritage Site

References

External links

 Hidaka official website 

Towns in Wakayama Prefecture
Hidaka, Wakayama
Populated coastal places in Japan